The 2011 Baden Masters were held from September 2 to 4 in Baden, Switzerland. It was the first event of the Men's World Curling Tour for the 2011–12 curling season. The total purse of the event was 29,000 Swiss francs (CHF).

Participating teams

Draw

Playoffs

External links
Official site 

Baden Masters, 2011
2011 in Swiss sport
Baden Masters